Ellis Charles Raymond Hadfield (5 August 1909 – 6 August 1996) was a canal historian and the author of many classic works on the British canal system, mostly published by the firm he co-founded, David & Charles.

Biography
Charles Hadfield was born at Pietersburg, South Africa, where his New Zealand-born father was an Assistant Resident Magistrate; his mother was daughter of a Devon clergyman. Hadfield went to England in 1924 to be educated at Blundell's School, Devon, after which he went up to St Edmund Hall, Oxford. In 1936 he joined the Oxford University Press.  He was invited to the home of the theatre critic and author Robert Aickman in May 1946, as were the author L Tom C Rolt and four others, the outcome of which was the formation of the Inland Waterways Association (IWA), a pressure group for the preservation and restoration of the waterways, with Aickman as chairman, Hadfield as vice-chairman and Rolt as secretary. In 1950 books about the waterways started to appear, to inform the public about their plight, with Rolt producing The Inland Waterways of England, Aickman producing Know your Waterways, and Hadfield producing Introducing Canals. Later the same year, his book British Canals appeared, which ultimately was expanded into a comprehensive series of books about canals throughout Great Britain.

Hadfield parted company with the IWA in 1951, after he, Rolt and others signed a memorandum suggesting that the organisation needed to have a policy of "priorities". This did not sit well with Aickman, who felt that all waterways should be retained and rule changes were introduced to force their exclusion. Hadfield recalled: 

In 1946 he became the director of publications at the Central Office of Information. He was a founder member of the Railway and Canal Historical Society in 1954 and in 1960 he joined his friend David St John Thomas in setting up the publishing company David & Charles and continued publishing a stream of canal books. This extended to a study of world canals, amassing a rich store of research material now kept at the National Waterways Museum, Ellesmere Port.

Between 1963 and 1966 he was a member of the British Waterways Board. He resigned from the management of the publishing firm in 1964 but continued to edit The Canals of the British Isles series. In 1971 he was invited to rejoin the IWA and became a vice-president in 1983.

He married Alice Mary Miller in 1945 who died seven years before him in 1989 and they had two sons (Henry,  who died an infant and Alexander who died in 2011) and a daughter (Molly). Hadfield had been appointed CMG in 1954.

Bibliography

Canals
 
 
  2nd edn 1959, (Phoenix House). 3rd edn 1966 (David & Charles), 4th edition 1969, 5th edn 1974, 6th edn 1979, 7th edn 1984 
 
  2nd edn 1967  (David & Charles)
  2nd edn 1970 
  2nd edn 1969, 3rd edn 1985 
 
  2nd edn 1970. 
  2nd edn 1981

Other works
The Cotswolds. Batsford, London, 1966. (With Alice Mary Hadfield)
The Cotswolds: A new study. David & Charles, 1973. (With Alice Mary Hadfield) 
Introducing the Cotswolds. David & Charles, 1976. (With Alice Mary Hadfield) 
Afloat in America: Two enthusiasts explore the United States and Canada by waterway and rail. David & Charles, Newton Abbot, 1979. (With Alice Mary Hadfield)

See also

Canals of the United Kingdom
History of the British canal system

References

Bibliography
 .

Further reading
 
Ridler, Anne, "Charles Hadfield", The Charles Williams Society Newsletter, No. 82. Autumn 1996, pp. 3–6.

1909 births
1996 deaths
South African emigrants to the United Kingdom
People educated at Blundell's School
British waterways activists
20th-century British historians